AP-4 complex subunit sigma-1 is a protein that in humans is encoded by the AP4S1 gene.

Function 

The heterotetrameric adaptor protein (AP) complexes sort integral membrane proteins at various stages of the endocytic and secretory pathways. AP4 is composed of 2 large chains, beta-4 (AP4B1) and epsilon-4 (AP4E1), a medium chain, mu-4 (AP4M1), and a small chain, sigma-4 (AP4S1, this gene).

Clinical relevance

Deficiency of AP-4 leads to childhood-onset hereditary spastic paraplegia and it is currently hypothesized that AP4-complex-mediated trafficking plays a crucial role in brain development and functioning.

See also
 AP2 adaptor complex

References

External links

Further reading

Proteins